Mottville may refer to:
Mottville, New York (a hamlet in the Town of Skaneateles)
Mottville Township, Michigan